Antonini may refer to
Antonini (name)
 Nerva–Antonine dynasty or Antonines, that ruled the Roman Empire from 96 AD to 192 AD
Palazzo Antonini, Udine in Italy
Antonine Itinerary, a 3rd-century register of the stations and distances along roads of the Roman Empire
Trechus antonini, a species of ground beetle

See also
 Antonin (disambiguation)